Bourhill v Young [1943] AC 92 (also titled Hay v Young) is a Scottish delict case, on the subject of how extensive an individual's duty is to ensure others are not harmed by their activities. The case established important boundaries on the scope of recovery for bystanders, or those uninvolved with physical harm. Where a woman suffered psychiatric harm after walking onto the scene of a motorcycle accident, she was deemed not to be a foreseeable victim, having not been in immediate danger of physical harm.

Facts
On 11 October 1938, Mr Young had been negligently riding a motorcycle along a road, and was involved in a collision with a car, fatally injuring him. At the time of the crash, Mrs Bourhill was about to leave a tram which she had been riding, around 50 ft from the scene of the accident. Mrs Bourhill heard the crash, commenting "I just got in a pack of nerves, and I did not know whether I was going to get it or not." Following the removal of Mr Young's body from the road, she approached the scene of the accident, seeing the blood remaining from the crash. Mrs Bourhill, at the time eight months pregnant, later gave birth to a stillborn child, and claimed she had suffered nervous shock, stress and sustained loss due to Mr Young.

Judgement
In order to succeed in her claim, Mrs Bourhill had to establish a duty of care had been owed to her by Mr Young. To find such a duty, the claimant must be foreseeable, or proximate to the scene of the accident. The House of Lords denied that Mrs Bourhill had been foreseeable to Mr Young, at the time of the accident. Lord Russell stated:

References

Scottish case law
House of Lords cases
1942 in Scotland
1942 in case law
Delict
1942 in British law